PrivatBank (Ukrainian: ПриватБанк) is the largest Ukrainian bank in terms of assets and the leader of Ukrainian retail banking market. It was registered on 19 March 1992. PrivatBank was one of the first to introduce modern digital banking and unique technological solutions in Ukraine, allowing customers to use most services remotely by means of Privat24.

According to results of 2021, PrivatBank's liquid assets amounted to UAH 296.4 billion. PrivatBank has the second-largest network of branches and the largest network of ATMs and terminals among Ukrainian banks. As of July 2022, more than 6,000 ATMs, 10,000 payment terminals and more than 200,000 POS terminals are operating in the network. The national banking service network of PrivatBank includes approximately 1,200 branches. PrivatBank is the largest issuer and acquirer of electronic payment means in Ukraine. The Bank owns PrivatMoney (money transfer system), Privat24 and LiqPay (most popular payment services in Ukraine).

PrivatBank was the first in Ukraine to connect Google Pay and Apple Pay payment services.

Until 2016, the Bank belonged to the Privat – financial an industrial group of Ukrainian oligarchs Ihor Kolomoiskyi and Gennadiy Bogolyubov. In December 2016, due to capital problems, a decision was made to pass PrivatBank into state ownership. Since then, the institution has been fully owned by the State.

PrivatBank is one of the systemically important banks in Ukraine.

History
PrivatBank is one of the first private commercial banks established in Ukraine. Decision on PrivatBank establishment was taken at the meeting of its founders on 7 February 1992.

On 19 March 1992, the Bank was registered by the State. Serhii Tihipko was one of the founders and the first Chairperson of the management board. At the very beginning, PrivatBank had only one office and a few computers. PrivatBank was the first in Ukraine to introduce plastic cards and ATMs.

In 1995, PrivatBank was given permission to be one of two banks privileged to allow anonymous hard currency accounts, by presidential decree.

In 1996 PrivatBank became a full member of Visa International (payment system) and commenced a large-scale issuance of plastic cards.

In 1997 PrivatBank became the first Ukrainian bank to obtain a Thomson BankWatch rating statement (an international rating agency) and became a full member of the Europay payment system.

In 1998 the Bank obtained Fitch IBCA rating statement (an international rating agency). In November 1998, the Bank won a tender and was selected as a servicing bank authorized to perform payments of the Swiss Holocaust Memorial Fund in Ukraine.

In 2000 the Bank joined the group of banks authorized to pay compensation to Ukrainian citizens who suffered from Nazi persecution during the Second World War. Also, in the same year, the organizational and legal form of PrivatBank changed: on 6 July, PrivatBank shareholders made a decision to reorganize the Bank from a limited liability company to a closed joint-stock company. The Charter of the Closed Joint-Stock Company Commercial Bank "PrivatBank" was registered on 4 September 2000.

The launch of the Privat24 project was a significant event in the Ukrainian banking system in 2001. Customers were able to manage their accounts online, make regular payments, transfer funds, etc.

In February 2002, PrivatBank issued its millionth plastic card.

In 2003, the Western Union system recognized PrivatBank as the best bank in terms of customer service quality. The Bank also obtained the STP Excellence Award from Deutsche Bank, which confirmed the professionalism of PrivatBank in international settlements.

According to the decision of the shareholders at the meeting on 30 April 2009, the Bank's activities were brought into line with the Law of Ukraine "On Joint-Stock Companies": corresponding changes were made to the Bank's Charter, and the type of the Bank was changed to a public joint-stock company. In addition, the name of the Bank was changed to Public Joint-Stock Company Commercial Bank "PrivatBank". These changes took effect on 21 July 2009.

In 2010, the Bank initiated the creation of the charity foundation which is called "Helping is easy!"

On 28 September 2015, the Standard&Poor's rating agency raised PrivatBank's long-term and short-term foreign currency ratings from SD to SS/C.

Nationalisation 
To prevent the destabilization of the financial system of Ukraine, to ensure the protection of depositors’ rights, and taking into account the systemic importance of PrivatBank, the State acquired the ownership of 100% of the Bank's shares in accordance with the procedure established by law on 21 December 2016, taking into account the decision of the National Security and Defense Council of Ukraine dated 18 December 2016 "On urgent measures to ensure the national security of Ukraine in the economic sphere and protect interests of depositors" that was put into effect by the Decree of the President of Ukraine No. 560/2016 as of 18 December 2016.

Currently, as of 27/02/23, the State is the only shareholder of the Bank, that owns 100% of the shares of the authorized capital. The functions of managing the corporate rights of the State in the Bank are carried out by the cabinet of Ukraine, which also performs functions of the Supreme body of the Bank.

Forensic audit 
The National Bank of Ukraine instigated a forensic audit by New York-based corporate investigations specialists Kroll Inc. It reported in that "PrivatBank was subjected to a large scale and coordinated fraud over at least a ten-year period ending December 2016, which resulted in the Bank suffering a loss of at least USD 5.5 billion." It also stated that 95% of corporate lending had been to "parties related to former shareholders and their affiliates".

Customers 
The bank is a universal bank that focuses on the retail segment, actively promoting services for small and medium businesses and selectively working in the corporate sector.

More than 25 million people have used the services of PrivatBank at least once in their lives, which is in Ukraine. Almost 19 million Ukrainians regularly use the services of PrivatBank, and there are currently 15 million customers of Privat24 digital banking.

The majority of corporate customers are small- and medium-sized enterprises. Special attention is paid to the service of network corporations.

The sectoral characteristics of the Bank's customer base show that a large part comprises trade and commercial enterprises. A significant share of corporate customers are enterprises in the food, transport, agricultural, and construction industries.

The Bank is the leader among Ukrainian banks regarding the number of customers: its services are used by half of the Ukrainian population. As of 2021, the Bank served 818,000 entrepreneurs and almost 18 million private individuals.  The volume of individual deposits attracted by PrivatBank in 2021 amounted to UAH 312.7 billion.

Innovations

PrivatBank is known for its innovations. In 1999, the Bank launched SMS-banking, and in 2000, it introduced dynamic one-time OTP passwords by linking the card to a mobile phone number.

In 2001, PrivatBank launched the Privat24 digital banking system. As of June 2022, 18 million people use the Privat24 digital banking system.

And in 2002, the Bank introduced electronic document management.

Subsequently, PrivatBank was the first in the world to introduce P2P transfers between cards on the Internet and began mass emission of instant cards. In 2005, the Bank emitted a millionth credit plastic card.

Beginning from 2004, PrivatBank has started to make international money transfers to Ukraine using the PrivatMoney payment system.

In 2008, PrivatBank created the first iPhone application in Eastern Europe – iPay, and in 2010, PrivatBank launched mobile payment terminals.

2012 was the year of the introduction of contactless cash withdrawal via ATMs using a smartphone and a QR code.

And in 2015, PrivatBank launched the technology of instant payment via QR code.

In 2016, Visa and PrivatBank announced the launch of the Visa Token Service in Ukraine, which replaces confidential payment card information with a unique digital identifier which is a token.

The next two years were favorable for smartphone owners: in 2017, PrivatBank brought Android Pay (now Google Pay) to Ukraine, and in 2018 – Apple Pay.

2019 was marked in the history of innovations by the updated Privat24. Beyond that, FacePay24 technology – payment by face – became available to bank customers for the first time in Ukraine. The Bank also implemented a number of digital services:

 tips paid via POS terminal;
 compulsory automobile liability insurance policies in Privat24;
 digital card and digital skins in Privat24;
 PrivatPay is a new online payment method.

In 2020, PrivatBank launched the "Money at the cash register" service that allows to receive cash at store cash registers. Besides, the Bank has the first biometric POS terminals in Ukraine.

Moreover, government services became available to customers:

 conclusion of gas supply contracts with Naftogaz by means of Privat24;
 identity verification and account opening in PrivatBank using digital documents in the Diia application.

In 2021, the Bank opened the first Concept Store in Ukraine – a fully digital office in Kyiv, which is informally called the branch of the future.

Main financial indicators 
PrivatBank earned a profit of UAH 35.050 billion according to the official data of the National Bank of Ukraine in 2021.

Below is information on the Bank's equity, assets, and net profit for the past 15 years. More detailed financial indicators of the Bank can be found on the Bank's website in the section. About the Bank – Financial reporting.

Ownership structure 
On 1 January 2022, the Bank's shareholders are (according to the final aggregate share):

Social projects
In 2011 PrivatBank, plans to launch a new social project "PrivatBank against drugs".

In January 2011, PrivatBank within 24 hours arranged fee-free fundraising campaign to aid Domodedovo explosion victims (Moscow, Russian Federation). Only in Ukraine over ₴105 thousand was raised.
In October 2010 it aided to families of those who died in the road accident in Marganets (Dnipropetrovsk Region, Ukraine); (₴101 thousand raised).

In 2010, PrivatBank established a separate charity project "To help is easy!" designed to collect donations for orphanages.
The bank provides its ATM infrastructure for fee-free fundraising for charity funds.

In March 2010, it supported sufferers from the explosion in Moscow Subway (₴11 thousand)

In June–July 2008, the company helped sufferers from the flood in Eastern Ukraine (₴530 thousand).

In 2008, JuniorBank was formed, where children and teenagers learn finance. In 2010, within the project "Create with pleasure!", exhibition galleries with creative works of retirees were arranged in the bank departments. With the help of "Skype: Victory Day" project veterans from many cities and countries were able to find their friends and talk to them. The project was nominated to the European Excellence Awards 2010.

International presence
International PrivatBank network comprises such bank partners as MoscomPrivatBank (Russian Federation), AS PrivatBank (Latvia), AS PrivatBank (Portugal) and TaoPrivatBank (Georgia). In addition, PrivatBank has branches and representative offices in twelve countries around the world, including Italy, Cyprus, Great Britain, Spain and China.

On 16 August 2007, the name of PrivatBank's Latvian subsidiary, AS Banka Paritāte, was officially changed to AS PrivatBank as part of a strategy to strengthen the banking group's regional brand recognition.

Management of the Bank 
The Cabinet of Ministers of Ukraine represents the executive body of the Bank, which carries out current management of the Bank's activities, which is the Management B Chairperson, and members of The Supervisory Board appoints the chair and members of the Bank's Management Boarders. There are 11 Management Board Committees that were established and that operate in the Bank:

Budget Committee
 Compliance and Financial Security Committee
 Assets and Liabilities Management Committee
 Banking Products and Tariffs Committee
 Change Management Committee
 Operational Risk and Information Security Committee
 Credit Committee
 Marketing and PR Committee
 Tender Committee
 Technological Committee
 Non-performing Assets Management Committee

The activities of the Bank’s Management Board are managed by the Chairperson of the Bank’s Management Board – Gerhard Boesch. The Chairperson of the Supervisory Board is Sharon Easky.

Management Board 

 Gerhard Boesch – Chairperson of the Management Board.
 Hanna Samarina – Deputy Chairperson of the Management Board (Chief Finance Officer).
 Larysa Chernyshova – Deputy Chairperson of the Management Board (Chief Risk Officer).
 Mariusz Kaczmarek – Deputy Chairperson of the Management Board (Chief Operation Officer).
 Dmytro Musiienko – Member of the Management Board  (Chief Retail Business Officer).
 Yevhen Zaihraiev – Member of the Management Board (Chief Small and Medium Business Officer).
 Anton Razumnyi – Member of the Management Board (Chief Compliance Officer).

Supervisory Board 

 Sharon Easky – Chairperson of the Supervisory Board, member of the Corporate Governance, Remuneration and Nomination Committee (independent member).
 Artem Shevalov – Deputy Chairperson of the Supervisory Board, member of the Technology, Data, and Innovation Committee, and member of the Strategy and Transformation Committee (state representative of the Cabinet of Ministers of Ukraine).
 Eran Klein – a member of the Supervisory Board, Chairman of the Risk Committee of the Supervisory Board, member of the Audit Committee, and member of the Technology, Data, and Innovation Committee (independent member).
 Yuliia Metsher – a member of the Supervisory Board, member of the Corporate Governance, Remuneration and Nomination Committee, member of the Risk Committee, member of the Strategy and Transformation Committee (state representative of the President of Ukraine).
 Sergiy Oleksiyenko – a member of the Supervisory Board, member of the Strategy and Transformation Committee, member of the Technology, Data and Innovation Committee, member of the Corporate Governance, Remuneration and Nomination Committee (state representative of the Verkhovna Rada Committee on Financial Policy and Banking).
 Roman Sulzhyk – member of the Supervisory Board, Chairman of the Technology, Data and Innovation Committee of the Supervisory Board, member of the Risk Committee, member of the Strategy and Transformation Committee (independent member).
 Olga Tomash – member of the Supervisory Board, Chairman of the Corporate Governance, Remuneration and Nomination Committee of the Supervisory Board, member of the Audit Committee, member of the Strategy and Transformation Committee (independent member).
 Nadir Shaikh – a member of the Supervisory Board, Chairman of the Audit Committee of the Supervisory Board, member of the Corporate Governance, Remuneration and Nomination Committee, and member of the Risk Committee (independent member).
 Sebastian Schoenaich-Carolath – a member of the Supervisory Board, Chairman of the Strategy and Transformation Committee of the Supervisory Board, member of the Audit Committee, and member of the Risk Committee (independent member).

See also

List of banks in Ukraine

Notes

References

External links

  
 ATMs, payment terminals, departments of PrivatBank on the map 

Banks of Ukraine
Companies based in Dnipro
Ukrainian brands
Privat Group
Ukrainian companies established in 1992
Banks established in 1992
Nationalised companies in Ukraine